The Milan Papyrus is a papyrus roll inscribed in Alexandria in the late 3rd or early 2nd century BC during the rule of the Ptolemaic dynasty.  Originally discovered by anonymous tomb raiders as part of a mummy wrapping, it was purchased in the papyrus "grey market" in Europe in 1992 by the University of Milan. Over six hundred previously unknown lines of Greek poetry are on the roll, representing about 112 brief poems, or epigrams. Two of these were already known and had been attributed by the 12th-century AD Byzantine scholar John Tzetzes to the Hellenistic epigrammatist Posidippus of Pella (c. 310 – c. 240 BC), a Macedonian who spent his literary career in Alexandria. The initial reaction has been to attribute all the new lines to Posidippus, though Franco Ferrari suggests that there is evidence the manuscript is an anthology, in which Posidippus' epigrams predominated.  

As the earliest surviving example of a Greek poetry book as well as the largest addition to the corpus of classical Greek poetry in many years, the tale of the discovery made The New York Times and National Geographic.

Labelled the "Milan Papyrus," it was published in a scholarly edition in 2001, edited by Guido Bastianini, Claudio Gallazzi and Colin Austin. In 2002, Austin and Bastianini published a more popular edition, Posidippi Pellaei quae supersunt omnia, "all the surviving works of Posidippus of Pella", including the epigrams of the papyrus, with Italian and English translations. Scholars have rushed to mine this new trove of highly conscious literary productions at the most sophisticated level that were created in a major center of Hellenistic culture. 

After a "standing-room only" discussion at the American Philological Association annual meeting in January 2001, a seminar on the Milan Papyrus was held at Harvard's Center for Hellenic Studies in April 2002, and international conferences were held at Milan, Florence and Cincinnati, in November 2002.

Scholarly work on the Milan Papyrus, on Posidippus, who is now revealed in a broader range of subjects, and on the Alexandrian literary epigram in general, was invigorated by the discovery and proceeds apace.

See also 
 List of ancient Egyptian papyri

Notes

References
Bastianini G. - Gallazzi C. (edd.), Papiri dell’Università di Milano - Posidippo di Pella. Epigrammi, LED Edizioni Universitarie, Milano, 2001, 
Austin C. - Bastianini G. (edd.), Posidippi Pellaei quae supersunt omnia , LED Edizioni Universitarie, Milano, 2002, 
Un Poeta Ritrovato. Posidippo di Pella. Giornata di studio - Milano 23 novembre 2001, LED Edizioni Universitarie, Milano, 2002,

External links
New Epigrams Attributed to Posidippus of Pella at the Center for Hellenic Studies, Harvard University, including the Greek text of the poems and English translations

Ancient Greek poems
Papyrus
Ptolemaic Greek inscriptions
Greek manuscripts
Greek-language papyri